Albert Reid was an Australian politician.

Albert Reid may also refer to:

Albert Reid, editor of The Record (Sherbrooke)

See also
Bert Reid (disambiguation)
Albert Reed (disambiguation)